Red Line may refer to:

Arts and entertainment

Films
 Red Line (1959 film), a Finnish film based on the 1909 novel
 Red Line (1996 film), an American crime drama film
 Red Line (2012 film), an American terrorist thriller film
 The Red Line, a 1982 Iranian film directed by Masoud Kimiai

Music
 Red Line (album), by Trans Am, 2000
 "Red Line", by 5 Seconds Of Sunmer song from 5SOS5 
 Red Line (For TA)", a 2009 song by Ayumi Hamasaki, a B-side of "You Were..."
 The Red Line, a 1978 opera by Aulis Sallinen based on the 1909 novel

Other media
 The Red Line (TV series), a 2019 American drama series
 The Red Line, a 1909 Finnish novel by Ilmari Kianto on which a film and opera are based

Public transit

Asia 
 Dark Red Line, Bangkok, Thailand
 Red Line (Delhi Metro), India
 Red Line (Doha Metro), Qatar
 Red Line (Dubai Metro), United Arab Emirates
 Red Line (Hyderabad Metro), India
 Red line (Kaohsiung MRT), Taiwan
 Red Line (Lucknow Metro), India
 Red Line (Namma Metro), Bangalore, India
 Bogor Line of KA Commuter line Jakarta Kota–Bogor, KRL Commuterline, Jakarta, Indonesia
 Light Red Line, Bangkok, Thailand
 Line 1 (Beijing Subway), China
 Line 1 (Shanghai Metro), China
 Midōsuji Line, Osaka, Japan
 North South MRT line, Singapore
 SRT Red Lines, Bangkok, Thailand
 Tamsui–Xinyi line, Taipei, Taiwan
 Tokyo Metro Marunouchi Line, Tokyo, Japan
 Tsuen Wan line, Hong Kong

Australia 
 Northern Line (Sydney), Australia

Europe 
 Red Line (Luas), Dublin, Ireland
 Red Line (Stockholm Metro), Sweden
 Athens Metro Line 2 (Red line), Greece
 Aŭtazavodskaja line, Minsk, Belarus
 Barcelona Metro line 1, Spain
 Central line (London Underground), England
 Leninskaya Line, Novosibirsk, Russia
 Line 1 (Kharkiv Metro) aka Kholodnohirsko–Zavodska line, Ukraine
 Line 1 (Saint Petersburg Metro), Russia
 Line 2 (Madrid Metro), Spain
 Line C (Prague Metro), Czech Republic
 Lyon Metro Line A, Lyon, France
 Milan Metro Line 1, Italy
 RER A, Paris, France
 Sviatoshynsko–Brovarska line, Kyiv, Ukraine
 Sokolnicheskaya line, Moscow, Russia
 Tyne and Wear Metro of Newcastle upon Tyne, UK (former line)
 Red Line (Lisbon Metro), Portugal
 U2 (Berlin U-Bahn), Germany

Middle East
 Red Line (Jerusalem Light Rail)
 Red Line (Tel Aviv Light Rail), Tel Aviv Light Rail (planned), Israel

North America 
 Red Line (Baltimore), Maryland Transit Administration, Maryland (Canceled)
 Red Line (Calgary), Alberta, Canada
 Red Line (CTA), Chicago, Illinois
 Red Line (Dallas Area Rapid Transit), Texas
 Red Line (IndyGo), Indianapolis Public Transportation Corporation, Indianapolis, Indiana
 Red Line (MARTA) (formerly North-South Line), Atlanta, Georgia
 Red Line (MBTA), Boston, Massachusetts
 Red Line (Pittsburgh), Port Authority, Pennsylvania
 Red Line (RTA Rapid Transit), Greater Cleveland Regional Transit Authority, Ohio
 Red Line (Sound Transit), Seattle, Washington
 Red Line (St. Louis MetroLink), Bi-State Development Agency, Missouri
 Red Line (TRAX), Utah Transit Authority, Salt Lake City area
 Red Line (Washington Metro), WMATA, Washington, D.C.
 Baltimore Light RailLink for Penn Station – Camden Yards Line aka Red Line, Maryland Transit Administration, Baltimore, Maryland
 B Line (Los Angeles Metro), California
 Capital MetroRail, Austin, Texas
 F Line (RTD), aka Red Line, Regional Transportation District, Denver, Colorado
 IRT Broadway–Seventh Avenue Line in New York City, colored red, serving the 
 Lynx Red Line, North Carolina
 MAX Red Line, Tri-Met, Portland, Oregon
 Metro Red Line (Minnesota), METRO/Minnesota Valley Transit Authority, suburban Minneapolis, Minnesota area
 METRORail Red Line, Houston, Texas
 PATCO Speedline, Philadelphia, Pennsylvania
 Rapid Ride Route 766 Red Line, ABQ RIDE, Albuquerque, New Mexico
 , Bay Area Rapid Transit, San Francisco Bay Area, California
 T Third Street, MUNI, San Francisco, California
 Valley Metro Rail, aka METRO Light Rail Red Line, Phoenix, Arizona
 Red Line (Montreal Metro), Canada (proposed)

South America
 Red Line (Rio de Janeiro), Brazil, an expressway

Other uses
 Red line (phrase), a figurative phrase used in English and Hebrew meaning a limit past which something shouldn't cross safely
 Red line (hockey), the center of the playing surface on an ice hockey rink
 Red Line (Namibia), a pest-exclusion fence separating Northern Namibia from the central and southern parts
 Red Line, the military line of defense in Operation Manta, along the 15th and later 16th parallel north, of the Chadian-Libyan Conflict
  All Red Line, a network of telegraph cables linking the British Empire
  Red Line Agreement, an agreement signed by partners in the Turkish Petroleum Company in 1928
 Red Line Synthetic Oil Corporation, an oil manufacturer for automotive and other performance applications
 Red Line, Iowa, an unincorporated community

See also
 Red Belt (Pittsburgh)
 Red route
 Redline (disambiguation)
 The Thin Red Line (disambiguation)
 Red telephone line (disambiguation)
 Punainen viiva (disambiguation)
 Magenta Line (disambiguation)
 Orange Line (disambiguation)
 Pink Line (disambiguation)
 Purple Line (disambiguation)